Zahir al-Umar al-Zaydani, alternatively spelled Daher al-Omar or Dahir al-Umar (1689/90 – 21 or 22 August 1775) was the autonomous Arab ruler of northern Palestine in the mid-18th century, while the region was part of the Ottoman Empire. For much of his reign, starting in the 1730s, his domain mainly consisted of the Galilee, with successive headquarters in Tiberias, Deir Hanna and finally Acre, in 1750. He fortified Acre, and the city became the center of the cotton trade between Palestine and Europe. In the mid-1760s, he reestablished the port town of Haifa nearby.

Zahir withstood sieges and assaults by the Ottoman governors of Damascus, who attempted to limit or eliminate his influence. He was often supported in these confrontations by the Shia Muslim clans of Jabal Amil. In 1771, in alliance with Ali Bey al-Kabir of the Egypt Eyalet and with backing from Russia, Zahir captured Sidon, while Ali Bey's forces conquered Damascus, both acts in open defiance of the Ottoman sultan. At the peak of his power in 1774, Zahir's rule extended from Beirut to Gaza and included the Jabal Amil and Jabal Ajlun regions. By then, however, Ali Bey had been killed, the Ottomans entered into a truce with the Russians, and the Ottoman imperial government felt secure enough to check Zahir's power. The Ottoman Navy attacked his Acre stronghold in the summer of 1775 and he was killed outside of its walls shortly after.

The wealth Zahir accumulated through monopolizing Palestine's cotton and olive oil trade to Europe financed his sheikhdom. For much of his rule, he oversaw a relatively efficient administration and maintained domestic security, although he faced and suppressed several rebellions by his sons. The aforementioned factors, along with Zahir's flexible taxation policies and his battlefield reputation made him popular among the local peasantry. Zahir's tolerance of religious minorities encouraged Christian and Jewish immigration to his domain. The influx of immigrants from other parts of the empire stimulated the local economy and led to the significant growth of the Christian communities in Acre and Nazareth and the Jewish community in Tiberias. He and his family, the Banu Zaydan, patronized the construction of commercial buildings, houses of worship and fortifications throughout the Galilee. Zahir's rule over a virtually autonomous area in Palestine has made him a national hero among Palestinians today.

Origins and early life

Zahir was born around 1690. His father, Umar, was a sheikh of the Banu Zaydan, a small family of Bedouin (nomadic Arab) origin which had abandoned nomadism under Zahir's grandfather, Salih, and settled as cultivators in the Tiberias area in the late 17th century. Zahir's mother was a member of the Sardiyya, a Bedouin tribe based in the Hauran. The Sidon eyalet (province) spanned the Galilee, southern Mount Lebanon, and the adjacent Mediterranean coast. Umar died in 1706 and was succeeded as head of the family by Zahir's eldest brother, Sa'd. The Zaydans were deposed from their  by the governor of Sidon the following year, after the death of Bashir, but were restored by Bashir's successor, Haydar Shihab, when he defeated his Druze rivals for control of Bashir's former  in 1711. The Zaydans occasionally transferred their  to Zahir during his adolescence to help prevent the authorities from holding the practical  accountable in the event of a default. Legal control of the Zaydani  gave Zahir considerable power within his clan.

Zahir's killing of a man from Tiberias during a brawl, in 1707, prompted Sa'd to move the family from the Tiberias area. They settled in Arraba, a village between the market towns of Tiberias, Safed, and Nazareth but away from the main highways, after being offered safe haven there by the chiefs of the Bedouin Banu Saqr tribe, who resided in the village. In Arraba, Zahir received a degree of formal education from a Muslim scholar, Abd al-Qadir al-Hifnawi. He also learned how to hunt and fight. When the nearby village of Bi'ina was attacked by the governor of Sidon sometime between 1713 and 1718, Zahir helped defend the village and evaded the governor's troops. According to contemporary chroniclers, this event, along with Zahir's moderate personality, made him a local folk hero. His martial talents gained him further respect among the peasantry throughout the 1720s.

Sa'd and Zahir also gained respect from the people of Damascus, with whom they continued commercial relationships established by their father. The wealth that earlier Zaydans had generated from trade with Damascus and Aleppo had given them the financial ability to establish themselves as tax farmers. Throughout the 1720s, Zahir frequently joined caravans bound for Damascus, where he bought and sold goods. Among the contacts Zahir made there was the Muslim scholar Abd al-Ghaffar al-Shuwayki, who introduced Zahir to Sayyid Muhammad of the Husayni family, whose members were part of the city's elite  (descendants of the Islamic prophet Muhammad). Zahir married Sayyid Muhammad's daughter and established her residence in Nazareth because she considered Arraba too small. When Sayyid Muhammad died, Zahir inherited his fortune.

Rise and consolidation of power

Establishing stronghold in the Galilee

Capture of Tiberias
Around 1730, the governor of Sidon and the rural sheikhs of Jabal Nablus (e.g Samaria) collaborated in a military campaign to suppress the Saqr Bedouins. The tribe had long dominated the area between Nablus and Safed, rendering the highways unsafe for travel and commerce, while often plundering villages and ignoring tax obligations. Under pressure, the Saqr resolved to appoint a local dignitary to negotiate on their behalf with the government. Their leader, Rashid al-Jabr, nominated Zahir for the role, hoping his tribe could benefit from the Zaydans' good reputation with the authorities and the local inhabitants. The Zaydans' chief at the time, Sa'd, was bypassed in favor of the younger Zahir, a signal that the tribe did not intend to subordinate themselves to the Zaydans' will. Philipp comments the Bedouins "probably hoped to use Zahir for their own purposes" but "did not anticipate how quickly Zahir al-Umar would use them for his own ambitions". 

Not long after allying with the Saqr, Zahir initiated his takeover of Tiberias with the Bedouins' support. The governor of Sidon consented, marking the first time a Zaydani  was directly appointed by a provincial governor rather than through the Shihabi . Zahir made Tiberias his principal base and was joined there by his Zaydani kinsmen. He appointed his cousin Muhammad, the son of Ali, as commander of the family militia. Zahir spent the 1730s fortifying Tiberias and expanding his territory.

Northern and western expansion

Due to the relative justice and fairness of his rule, peasants from nearby areas moved to Zahir's domains or invited him to rule over them. Zahir accepted their proposition and obtained permission from Sidon's governor, Ibrahim Pasha al-Azm, to seize the area. Ahmad had also requested permission to attack Zahir, to which Ibrahim Pasha consented in the hope of neutralizing two powerful local leaders. In 1738, Zahir assembled a 1,500-strong force and defeated Ahmad's forces near the Jiddin fortress, occupying it and the adjacent areas under its control, namely Abu Sinan, to the west, and Tarshiha, to the east. During the confrontation, Zahir encountered a mercenary, Ahmad Agha al-Dinkizli, whom he commissioned to raise and command a private army of Maghrebi troops.   

Zahir next moved on Safed, whose , Muhammad al-Naf'i, surrendered the town around 1740, after prolonged negotiations and military pressure. Control of the strategically situated town, with its citadel built on a high hill, gave the Zaydans command over the surrounding countryside. Afterward, the fortified village of Bi'ina, which had withstood a siege by Zahir in 1739, was added to his domains through an agreement sealed by Zahir's marriage to the daughter of the village  (headman). He also acquired the fortress of Suhmata through diplomacy, followed by  the nearby fortified village of Deir al-Qassi, after marrying the daughter of its sheikh, Abd al-Khaliq Salih. All the above gains solidified his hold over the northern and eastern Galilee.

Capture of Nazareth and conflict with Nablus
Nazareth, a mostly Christian town, came under Zahir's control by the end of 1740, following his capture of Safed. Philipp contends the extension of Zahir's rule southward toward Nazareth and the neighboring Marj Ibn Amer, the wide plain between the Galilee and Jabal Nablus through which the Damascus–Nablus trade routes passed, was a drawn-out process and the precise dating of the associated events is unclear. Although it administratively belonged to the Sidon Eyalet, Nazareth was controlled by the rural chiefs of Nablus Sanjak, a district of the Damascus Eyalet. The town was the residence of Zahir's first, Damascene wife and the hometown of his second wife. Through these connections, he forged good ties with its residents. They preferred Zahir, who had a reputation for religious tolerance, over the chiefs and merchants of Nablus, who they viewed as oppressive or extortionary. 

The dominant clans of Jabal Nablus, especially the Jarrar family, challenged Zahir's advance, recruiting the Saqr as allies. By then, the Saqr had become hostile toward Zahir, their ostensible junior partner, for stemming their raids against the peasants in his territories. Probably sometime after 1738, Zahir, backed by his kinsmen, Maghrebi mercenaries, and the residents of Nazareth, routed the Jarrar–Saqr coalition at the Marj Ibn Amer village of al-Rawda, near al-Mansi. Following his victory, Zahir called for reinforcements from the people of his domains to subdue Jabal Nablus. Among them were many residents of Nazareth, including Christian women who supplied the troops with food and water. Zahir's forces pursued the Jarrars to their throne village of Sanur, but withdrew after failing to capture its fortress. The defeat marked the limit of Zahir's influence south of Marj Ibn Amer and confirmed the Jarrars as the dominant force of Jabal Nablus over their rivals, the Tuqans. While the Jarrars and Zahir eventually concluded a truce, the former continued to mobilize the clans of Jabal Nablus to prevent Zahir's southward expansion.

Confrontations and respite with Damascus

Zahir's rise coincided with that of the Azm family, whose members governed Damascus Eyalet for over a quarter century, beginning with Isma'il Pasha al-Azm in 1725. The Azms often attempted to expand their control to the provinces of Tripoli and Sidon. Isma'il Pasha's brother, Sulayman Pasha al-Azm, became governor of Sidon in 1733, before taking up office in Damascus the following year. He opposed Zahir's buildup of power on the borders of his province and encroachments into the Nablus Sanjak. More alarming to the governor than Zahir's activities in Palestine were his incursions east of the Jordan River. In 1737 and 1738, he had launched raids into the Golan Heights and the Hauran plain, and attacked Damascus city. For threatening Damascus, the imperial government determined Zahir was a threat to the all-important Hajj pilgrim caravan to Mecca, which was annually marshaled in Damascus and traditionally led by its governor. With Constantinople's sanction, Sulayman Pasha launched an abortive attack against Zahir in 1738. The Banu Saqr then captured his brother, Salih, and handed him over to Sulayman Pasha, who executed him, further embittering Zahir toward the Saqr. Sulayman Pasha renewed his efforts to suppress the Zaydans in 1741, enlisting his nephew, Ibrahim Pasha of Sidon, who was defeated by Zahir near Acre.

In September 1742, Sulayman Pasha besieged Tiberias for ninety days, with unprecedented orders from Constantinople to execute Zahir. The latter proclaimed his loyalty to the Ottoman sultan, but failed to sway Sulayman Pasha during ensuing negotiations. When Sulayman Pasha lifted the siege to lead the Hajj caravan, Zahir marshaled French mercantile partners in Acre and Jewish allies in Tiberias to lobby the authorities in Constantinople. His efforts to sway the government failed and Sulayman Pasha resumed the operation after his return to Damascus in July 1743. He died suddenly in August on the outskirts of Tiberias, and Zahir used the opportunity to assault his camp and capture its weapons and goods. 

Sulayman Pasha's successor, his nephew As'ad Pasha al-Azm, relented from further action against Zahir. The following fourteen years were characterized by peace between Zahir and Damascus, partly because As'ad Pasha was dissuaded by his brother's unsuccessful experience and occupied with domestic affairs.  In late 1757, the Banu Sakhr and Sardiyya tribes launched an assault on the Hajj caravan on its return to Syria. Thousands of Muslim pilgrims were killed in the raid, including Sultan Osman III's sister. The attack shocked the government, and discredited the governor of Damascus, Husayn Pasha ibn Makki, for failing to ward off the Bedouin. Husayn Pasha had replaced As'ad Pasha, and among his priorities were subduing Zahir. He lodged a complaint to the imperial government alleging Zahir's involvement in the raid. Zahir denied the allegation and pressed for an investigation into the assault. To earn the government's favor, he purchased the looted goods of the caravan from the Bedouin, including the decorated banners representing the Islamic prophet Muhammad and the sovereignty of the sultan, and restored them to Sultan Mustafa III (Osman III had died on 30 October). Husayn Pasha was replaced by Uthman Pasha al-Kurji in 1760.

Control of Acre and Haifa

Zahir consolidated his authority over the port of Acre in a drawn-out process starting in the 1730s. Joudah views Zahir's moves as "inevitable", considering he already controlled Acre's fertile countryside and needed "an outlet to the sea" and was probably motivated by "potential profits". Zahir had commercial dealings with the French merchants of the city through his Acre-based partner, the Melkite merchant Yusuf al-Qassis. His first contact with the merchants came in 1731 when he arranged the settlement of debts owed to them by his brother Sa'd. Control of Acre would greatly improve his business potential, and the peace with Damascus under As'ad Pasha enabled Zahir to focus his military resources against the city. 

In 1743, Zahir had his cousin Muhammad arrested and executed to remove him as a rival for influence in Acre. Zahir took Acre by force, probably in 1744, and killed its . In the first few years following his takeover of Acre, Zahir resided in Deir Hanna. He began fortifying Acre by building a wall around it in 1750. He built other fortifications and public buildings in Acre and promoted immigration to the city, which became his new headquarters. Afterward, Zahir confiscated five villages in Sahil Akka (the coastal plain of Acre), Julis, Mazra'a, Makr, Judayda, and Sumayriyya, as personal estates, which he also developed. He installed water mills on the Na'aman River south of Acre and the Ga'aton River north of the city, both part of the 16th-century  (endowment) of Sinan Pasha to which he paid a fixed amount yearly.

In 1757, Zahir had expanded his holdings southward, along Palestine's northern coastal plain, taking control of the villages of Haifa, Tira, and Tantura, and nearby Mount Carmel. Ostensibly, Zahir captured the harbor village of Haifa to eliminate the base established there by Maltese pirates, but he probably aimed to prevent the governors of Damascus from utilizing the port village, strategically positioned across the bay from Acre, as a launchpad against him, while also seeking another potential port for his domains. While As'ad Pasha had not acted against Zahir's occupation of Haifa, Uthman Pasha sought to return the port to Damascene authority. Acting on Uthman Pasha's request, the governor of Sidon, Nu'man Pasha, dispatched 30 Maghrebi mercenaries on a vessel captained by a Frenchman to capture Haifa in May 1761. Upon arrival, Zahir had the ship confiscated, its soldiers arrested, and its captain fined. The issue over Haifa's annexation was smoothed over with the assistance of Yaqub Agha, a Constantinople-based official with friendly ties to Zahir. Yaqub Agha had a high-ranking official, Sulayman Agha, revoke the imperial order sanctioning Uthman Pasha's attempt to capture the Haifa coast.

Family rebellions

To safeguard his interests in the Galilee, particularly after establishing headquarters in Acre, Zahir installed his sons at strategic fortresses across the region. In the 1760s, many of his sons increasingly struggled against him and each other to expand their holdings in anticipation of their aging father's death. 

In 1761, Zahir had Uthman assassinate Sa'd, hitherto his chief adviser and a key figure behind his successes, in exchange for control of Shefa-Amr. Zahir reneged after Sa'd's killing, prompting Uthman and his full-brothers Ahmad and Sa'd al-Din to besiege Shefa-Amr in 1765, but they were repulsed. In May 1766, Uthman renewed his rebellion against Zahir but was again defeated. Mediation by Isma'il Shihab of Hasbaya culminated in a peace summit near Tyre where Zahir and Uthman reconciled and Uthman was given control of Nazareth.

In September 1767, a conflict between Zahir and his son Ali, who controlled Safed, broke out over the former's refusal to cede control of the strategic fortress villages of Deir Hanna and Deir al-Qassi. Before the dispute, Ali had been a key supporter of his father, helping suppress dissent among his brothers and quashing external threats. Zahir's forces marched on Safed later that month, pressuring Ali to surrender. Zahir pardoned Ali, but gave him Deir al-Qassi. The intra-family conflict resumed weeks later, with Ali and his full brother Sa'id poised against Zahir and Uthman. Ibrahim Sabbagh, Zahir's financial adviser, brokered a settlement giving Sa'id control over the villages of Tur'an and Hittin. Ali continued to hold out and took over Deir Hanna, which Zahir previously denied him. Joined by Zahir's eldest son, Salibi, who controlled Tiberias, Ali defeated Zahir, who had demobilized his troops and was relying on local volunteers from Acre. Zahir subsequently remobilized his Maghrebi mercenaries and defeated Ali, prompting him to flee Deir Hanna in October. Nevertheless, he pardoned Ali for a fine and ceded him control of the fortress village. By December 1767, Zahir's intra-family disputes had subsided for the time being.

The rebellions by Zahir's sons were nearly always backed by the governor of Damascus, Uthman Pasha, in a bid to sustain the internal dissent and weaken Zahir. The latter lodged complaints to the imperial government about Uthman Pasha's support for his rebellious sons at least once in 1765. Zahir received the support of the governor of Sidon, Muhammad Pasha al-Azm, an opponent of Uthman Pasha who sought to restore the Azms to office in Damascus. While Sidon's support had no practical military value, the support of his nominal superior provided Zahir with official legitimacy amid his family's insurrections.

Alliance with the Metawalis of Jabal Amil

Zahir's takeover of the Safed region and the western Galilee removed the barriers between him and the Twelver Shia Muslim clans of Jabal Amil, the predominantly Twelver Shia hill country east of Tyre and Sidon, who were referred to in the sources as the 'Metawalis'. Their territory was wedged between the Shihabs in Mount Lebanon and the Zaydans in northern Palestine. In 1743, Nassar, the chief of the Ali al-Saghirs, the dominant Metawali clan in the Bilad Bishara , assisted government forces in their campaign against Zahir. With Zahir's support, the Ali al-Saghirs routed the Shihabs at Marjayoun. Zahir al-Nassar died that year and was succeeded by his brother, Nasif al-Nassar, who soon emerged as the most powerful chief of the Metawalis.

Nasif and the other Metawali chiefs backed Zahir's son Uthman during his rebellion against him in 1766, and then his other son Ali in 1767. Amid the conflict, Zahir captured the fortified Metawali-held villages of Bassa and Yaroun on the borders of Zaydani territory. While the contemporary al-Rukayni and the near contemporary Mikha'il Sabbagh agree that the capture of the two villages were the cause of the subsequent battles between Zahir and Nasif, they diverge on the other details. After a series of clashes, the two sides fought at the village of Tarbikha on 6 October 1766. While Sabbagh claims it ended in a victory for Zahir, al-Rukayni held Nasif was the decisive victor. Thereafter, Zahir's Maghrebi mercenaries supposedly employed a ruse by capturing two of Nasif's yong sons from Nasif's headquarters, the Tebnine castle, compelling Nasif to negotiate terms. This account is considered a local legend by the historian Stefan Winter, and Philipp deems Rukayni more reliable for these events.

Despite their conflict, Zahir and the Metawalis shared an interest in limiting the power of Sidon and keeping the Druze forces of Mount Lebanon at bay. Zahir's son Uthman mediated an end to the conflict and secured a treaty between Zahir and Nasif. Rukayni dates the treaty ceremony to 24 November 1767. According to its terms, Zahir would keep control of Bassa and Yaroun, he would represent the Metawalis in their fiscal and other relations with the governor of Sidon, and he reduced their tax obligations to Sidon by a quarter. He promised his backing for the Metawalis in any confrontation with the Shihabs and the Druze, in return for the Metawalis' military support. The backing of some 10,000 Metawali fighters significantly boosted his military potential, and the Metawalis "remained faithful allies ... to the end", in the words of Philipp, participating in fifteen subsequent campaigns against Zahir's foes. The alliance secured Zahir's northern borders, allowing him to focus on operations in the south.

Peak of power
In 1768, the Porte partially recognized or legitimized Zahir's de facto political position by granting him the title of 'Sheikh of Acre, Emir of Nazareth, Tiberias, Safed, and Sheikh of all Galilee'. This recognition was tempered when Yaqub Agha was executed shortly after and Sulayman Agha died in 1770, depriving Zahir of close allies in Constantinople. In November 1770, Uthman Pasha engineered the replacement of Sidon's governor with his own son, Darwish Pasha, and succeeded in having his other son, Muhammad Pasha, appointed to Tripoli. Uthman Pasha was committed to ending Zahir's rule, which was left especially vulnerable with the loss of support in the imperial capital. In response to threats from Damascus, Zahir further strengthened Acre's fortifications and armed every adult male in the city with a rifle, two pistols and a sabre. He mended ties with his sons, who held  throughout the Galilee, and consolidated his relationship with the Shia clans of Jabal Amil, thereby cementing his local alliances.

Alliance with Ali Bey and war with Damascus

Although Zahir was bereft of support in Constantinople and Damascus, he was forging a new alliance with the increasingly autonomous mamluk governor of Egypt and the Hejaz, Ali Bey al-Kabir. Seeking to extend his influence to Syria for strategic purposes vis-a-vis his conflict with the Porte, Ali Bey had a mutual interest with Zahir in subduing Damascus. He dispatched 15,000-20,000 Egyptian troops to the port cities of Gaza and Jaffa under commander Ismail Bey. Together, Zahir and Ismail crossed the Jordan Valley with their armies and moved north toward Damascus. They made it as far as Muzayrib, but Ismail abruptly halted his army's advance after confronting Uthman Pasha as he was leading the Hajj caravan in order to avoid harming the Muslim pilgrims. Ismail considered attacking the governor at that point to be a grave religious offense. He subsequently withdrew to Jaffa.

Zahir was surprised and angered by Ismail's reticence to attack. In a unilateral move to impose his authority in Uthman Pasha's jurisdiction, Zahir had his son Ahmad and other subordinate commanders collect taxes from villages in Damascus Eyalet, including Quneitra, while he dispatched Ali on a campaign against the Banu Nu'aym tribe in the Hauran, also part of Damascus. In response to Zahir's indignation, Ali Bey sent him 35,000 troops under Abu al-Dhahab in May. Together with Ismail's troops in Jaffa, the Egyptian army captured Damascus from Uthman Pasha in June, while Zahir and his Metawali allies captured the city of Sidon from Darwish Pasha. However, Abu al-Dhahab was persuaded by Ismail that confronting the Ottoman sultan, who carried a high religious authority as the caliph of Islam, was "truly ... a scheme of the Devil" and a crime against their religion. A short time after capturing Damascus, Abu al-Dhahab and Ismail withdrew from the city, whose inhabitants were "completely astonished at this amazing event", according to a chronicler of the time period. The sudden turn of events compelled Zahir's forces to withdraw from Sidon on 20 June.

Abu al-Dhahab's withdrawal frustrated Zahir who proceeded to make independent moves, first by capturing Jaffa in August 1771, after driving out its governor Ahmad Bey Tuqan. Shortly thereafter, he captured the cotton-producing Bani Sa'b district (centered around Tulkarm), which was held by Mustafa Bey Tuqan. Zahir had Jaffa fortified and garrisoned with 2,000 men. By the end of August, Uthman Pasha restored his control over Ramla and Gaza, but Zahir retained Jaffa.

In an attempt to expand his zone of influence to Nablus, the commercial center of Palestine and its agriculturally-rich hinterland, Zahir besieged Nablus in late 1771. Nablus was under the de facto control of the Tuqan and Nimr clans, local rivals of the Jarrars. The loss of Jaffa and Bani Sa'b stripped Nablus of its sea access. Nablus was defended by 12,000 mostly peasant riflemen under Nimr and Tuqan commanders. After nine days of clashes, Zahir withdrew to avoid a costly stalemate. As he departed Nablus, his forces raided many of the city's satellite villages, from which its peasant defenders originated.

Uthman Pasha had resumed his governorship of Damascus at the end of June 1771 and was determined to eliminate Zahir. To that end, he assembled a coalition that included Darwish Pasha, Muhammad Pasha and Yusuf Shihab. In late August, Uthman Pasha reached Lake Hula at the head of 10,000 soldiers. Before Uthman Pasha could be joined by his allies, Zahir and Nasif confronted the governor on 2 September. Zahir's son Ali raided Uthman Pasha's camp, while Zahir's other troops blocked them from the west. Uthman Pasha's troops hastily retreated towards the Jordan River, the only place where they were not surrounded. The overwhelming majority drowned in the river, with only 300–500 survivors, including Uthman Pasha, who almost drowned before being rescued by one of his men. The Battle of Lake Hula marked a decisive victory for Zahir, who entered Acre triumphantly with the spoils of Uthman Pasha's camp. He was celebrated by the city's residents and on the way there, had been given honorary gun salutes by the fortified villages between Tiberias and Acre. He also received congratulations from the French merchant ships at the port of Acre. Zahir's victory encouraged Ali Bey to relaunch his Syrian campaign.

Following his victory, Zahir had Darwish Pasha vacate Sidon on 13 October. He returned two days later after receiving Yusuf Shihab's backing. Zahir decided to move against Yusuf Shihab and, together with Nasif, confronted him and his 37,000 men at the village of Nabatieh on 20 October. Zahir's Metawali cavalry feigned retreat, luring Yusuf Shihab's army into a place where they were surrounded by Zahir's men, who dealt them a decisive blow. Yusuf Shihab thereafter retreated to his mountain village of Deir al-Qamar, leaving Sidon under Sheikh Ali Jumblatt and 3,000 Druze defenders. When news of Zahir's victory reached them, Ali Jumblatt and Darwish Pasha withdrew from the city, which was subsequently occupied by Zahir and Nasif. Uthman Pasha and all of his sons were consequently dismissed from their posts by the Porte. Although he could not capture Nablus and its hinterland, Zahir's domain by the end of 1771 extended from Sidon to Jaffa and included an influential presence in the Hauran plain.

Muhammad Tuqan captured Jaffa from Zahir in May 1772, the same month that Ali Bey arrived in Acre to seek Zahir's protection after being forced out of Egypt by rival mamluks. In June, the Ottoman loyalist Jazzar Pasha took over Beirut from local Druze sheikhs. The Druze had previously been in conflict with Zahir, but due to Jazzar's offensive, the circumstances fostered an alliance between them, Zahir, and the Metawali clans. Zahir and Ali Bey captured Jaffa with help from the Russian Fleet after a nine-month siege, in which they exhausted many of their resources. Before that, in late October 1772, Zahir and his Druze and Metawali allies captured Beirut from Jazzar, also with Russian naval support.

In March 1773, Ali Bey left Palestine to reestablish himself in Egypt, but Abu al-Dhahab had him killed when he arrived. With this came an end to the alliance that politically and economically aligned Egypt and Palestine for the first time since the early 16th century. While their attempts to unite their territories were unsuccessful, their rule posed the most serious domestic challenge to Ottoman rule in the 18th century. As a consequence of Ali Bey's death, Zahir moved to strengthen his hold over Jaffa and capture Jerusalem, but he failed in the latter attempt. All of Syria came under the official command of Uthman Pasha al-Misri in 1774 in order to bring stability to its provinces. Misri avoided conflict with Zahir and sought to establish friendly terms with him. He convinced the Porte to appoint Zahir governor of Sidon as long as Zahir paid all of the taxes the province had owed the Porte. Misri further promoted Zahir in February by declaring him 'Governor of Sidon, Nablus, Gaza, Ramla, Jaffa and Jabal Ajlun', although this title was not imperially sanctioned. In effect, Zahir was the de facto ruler over Palestine (with the exception of Nablus and Jerusalem), Jabal Amil, and the Syrian coast from Gaza to Beirut.

Downfall and death
Misri was recalled to Constantinople in the summer of 1774 and Muhammad Pasha al-Azm was appointed governor of Damascus. Zahir's governorship of Sidon was thus left vulnerable because it had largely depended on guarantees from Misri. Azm sought peaceful relations with Zahir, but the Porte, having made peace with Russia and relieving itself from the Russo-Ottoman War, aimed to move against the rebellious rulers of its provinces, including Zahir. Azm secured an official pardon of Zahir from the Porte in April 1775, but his governorship of Sidon was not preserved. Meanwhile, conflict between Zahir and his sons was renewed, with Ali attempting to capture Zahir's villages in the Galilee in 1774. Zahir defeated Ali with support from his other son Ahmad. Later that year, Zahir's rule was challenged by his son Sa'id, Zahir armed and mobilized 300 of Acre's civilian inhabitants to counter Sa'id. Ali continued to undermine his father's rule by encouraging defections by his Maghrebi mercenaries through bribes.

On 20 May 1775, Abu al-Dhahab, having been encouraged by the Porte to eradicate Zahir's influence, captured Jaffa and slaughtered its male inhabitants. News of the massacre spurred the people of Acre into a mass panic, with its residents fleeing and storing their goods in the city's Khan al-Ifranj caravanserai for safekeeping. On 24 May, Zahir also departed the city, leaving for Sidon. Ali subsequently entered and declared himself governor. However, his Maghrebi troops abandoned him and looted the city as Abu al-Dhahab's troops approached it a few days later. They proceeded to conquer Sidon by sea, prompting Zahir to seek shelter with Metawali allies in Jabal Amil. Some of Zahir's sons attempted to secure their own peace with Abu al-Dhahab, but the latter became ill and died on 10 June, causing the collapse and chaotic withdrawal of his Egyptian troops from Acre. Zahir reentered the city two days later and reestablished order with the assistance of Dinkizli. However, the setback of Abu al-Dhahab's death did not preclude the Porte from attempting to check Zahir's power and Sidon remained in direct government control.

On 23 April, the Porte dispatched the Ottoman Navy admiral, Hasan Pasha al-Jazayiri, to blockade Acre. He reached Haifa on 7 August, taking Jaffa from Zahir's son-in-law, Karim al-Ayyubi. Hasan Pasha ordered Zahir to pay arrears of the  accruing from 1768. Zahir initially agreed to pay 500,000 piasters of the total amount upfront and a further 50,000 piasters to Hasan Pasha personally to "spare the blood of the people". Hasan Pasha accepted Zahir's proposals, but the arrangements fell apart.

The accounts differ as to why the negotiations collapsed, but agree that their failure was the result of disputes within Zahir's inner circle between Sabbagh and Dinkizli. Most accounts claim that Sabbagh urged Zahir not to pay the requested sums and agitated for war. Sabbagh argued that Zahir's treasury lacked the funds and that Zahir's forces were capable of defeating Hasan Pasha. Dinkizli pressed Zahir to pay, arguing that mass bloodshed could be averted. He advised Zahir to force Sabbagh to pay the amount if Zahir could not afford it. When the negotiations dragged on, Hasan Pasha pressed for a full repayment of the  arrears, warning Zahir that he would be executed if he failed to do so. Insulted by the threat, he threatened to destroy Hasan Pasha's fleet unless he withdrew.

Hasan Pasha proceeded to bombard Acre, and Zahir's Maghrebi artillerymen responded with cannon fire, damaging two of imperial ships. The following day, Hasan Pasha's fleet fired roughly 7,000 shells against Acre without returning fire from the city's artillerymen; Dinkizli ordered his Maghrebi forces to disengage because as Muslims they were prohibited from attacking the sultan's military. Realizing his long-time lieutenant's betrayal, Zahir attempted to flee Acre on 21 August or 22 August. As he departed its gates, he was fired on by Ottoman troops, with a bullet striking his neck and causing him to fall off his horse. A Maghrebi soldier then decapitated him. Zahir's severed head was subsequently delivered to Constantinople.

Aftermath
Following his death, Sabbagh and Zahir's sons Abbas and Salih were arrested by Hasan Pasha's men. Sabbagh was executed by Hasan Pasha. The sons were imprisoned in Constantinople. The Porte confiscated property belonging to Zahir, his sons and Sabbagh, valued at 41,500,000 piasters. Also arrested with Zahir's sons was their physician, who was known to be skilled. The physician was summoned by the sultan to treat his ailing wife, which he did successfully, earning him his release and a medal of honor from the sultan. The physician used his influence with the authorities to have Zahir's children and grandchildren released and returned to their hometowns. Dinkizli was rewarded with the governorship of Gaza, but died en route to his new headquarters, likely having been poisoned by Hasan Pasha.

Zahir's sons Uthman, Ahmad, Sa'id and Ali continued to resist government forces, with Ali putting up the longest fight from his fortress in Deir Hanna. On 22 July 1776, the fortress capitulated to the combined forces of Hasan Pasha and Jazzar Pasha. Ali fled, but was killed later that year in the area between Tiberias and Safed. By then, the rest of Zahir's sons had been arrested or killed. Abbas was later appointed by Sultan Selim III as the sheikh of Safed. In 1799, when Napoleon invaded Palestine and withdrew after being defeated by Jazzar in Acre, Abbas and Salih left Safed with the departing French forces. This marked the end of Zaydani influence in the Galilee.

Constantin-François Volney, who wrote the first European biography of Zahir in 1787, lists three main reasons for Zahir's failure. First, the lack of "internal good order and justness of principle". Secondly, the early concessions he made to his children. Third, and most of all, the avarice of his adviser and confidant, Ibrahim Sabbagh.

Politics

Administration

Zahir appointed many of his brothers and sons as local administrators, particularly after he consolidated his control over Acre, which became the capital of his territory. Except for Acre and Haifa, Zahir divided the remainder of his territory between his relatives. His eldest brother was appointed to Deir Hanna, and his younger brothers Yusuf and Salih were installed in I'billin and Arraba, respectively. Salibi was killed in 1773 fighting alongside Ali Bey's forces in Egypt. His death deeply distressed Zahir, who was around 80 years old at the time. He appointed Uthman in Kafr Kanna then Shefa-Amr, Abbas in Nazareth, Ali in Safed, and Ahmad in Saffuriya. Ahmad replaced Salibi in Tiberias as well, and also conquered Ajlun and Salt in Transjordan. Ahmad was given authority over Deir Hanna after Sa'd's death. Zahir appointed his son-in-law Karim al-Ayyubi in Jaffa and Gaza, while Dinkizli was made  in Sidon in 1774. The appointment of Zahir's relatives and close associates was meant to ensure the efficient administration of his expanding realm and the loyalty of his circle. Among their chief functions was to ensure the supply of cotton to Acre. It is not clear if these posts were recognized by the Ottoman government.

This official had always been a Melkite (local Greek Catholic). His first vizier was Yusuf al-Arqash, followed by Yusuf Qassis in 1749. Qassis continued in this role until the early 1760s when he was arrested for attempting to smuggle wealth he had accumulated during his service to Malta. He was succeeded by Ibrahim Sabbagh, who had served as a personal physician for Zahir in 1757 when he replaced Zahir's longtime physician Sulayman Suwwan. The latter was a local Greek Orthodox Christian and when he failed to properly treat Zahir during a serious illness in 1757, Qassis used the opportunity to replace him with Sabbagh, a friend and fellow Melkite. Sabbagh became the most influential figure in Zahir's administration, particularly as Zahir grew old. This caused consternation among Zahir's sons as they viewed Sabbagh to be a barrier between them and their father and an impediment to their growing power in Zahir's territory. Sabbagh was able to gain increased influence with Zahir largely because of the wealth he amassed through his integral role in managing Zahir's cotton monopoly. Much of this wealth was acquired through Sabbagh's own deals where he would purchase cotton and other cash crops from the local farmers and sell them to the European merchants in Syria's coastal cities and to his Melkite partners in Damietta, Egypt. Sabbagh served other important roles as well, including as Zahir's political adviser, main administrator and chief representative with European merchants and Ottoman provincial and imperial officials.

There were other officials in Zahir's civil administration in Acre, including chief religious officials, namely the mufti and the qadi (judge). The mufti was the chief scholar among the ulema (Muslim scholarly community) and oversaw the interpretation of Islamic law in Zahir's realm. Although he was appointed by the Sublime Porte, Zahir managed to maintain the same mufti for many years at a time in contrast with the typical Syrian province which saw its mufti replaced annually. The mufti was a Damascene, Abd al-Halim al-Shuwayki, who had been an old friend of Zahir's family when they were based in Tiberias and had often hosted Zahir during his business trips to Damascus. Zahir directly appointed the qadi from Palestine's local ulema, but his judicial decisions had to be approved by the qadi of Sidon. Zahir had a chief imam, who in the last years of his rule was Ali ibn Khalid of Sha'ab. An agha was also appointed to supervise the customs payments made by the European merchants in Acre and Haifa.

Zahir's initial military forces consisted of his Zaydani kinsmen and the inhabitants of the areas he ruled. They numbered about 200 men in the early 1720s, but grew to about 1,500 in the early 1730s. During this early period of Zahir's career, he also had the key military backing of the Banu Saqr and other Bedouin tribes. As he consolidated his hold over Galilee, his army rose to over 4,000 men, many of the later recruits being peasants who supported Zahir for protecting them against Bedouin raids. This suppression of the Bedouin in turn caused the tribes to largely withdraw their military backing of Zahir. The core of his private army were the Maghrebi mercenaries. The Maghrebis' commander, Dinkizli, also served as Zahir's top military commander from 1735 until Dinkizli's defection during the Ottoman siege of Acre in 1775. From the time Zahir reconciled with Sheikh Nasif of Jabal Amil in 1768 until most of the remainder of his rule, Zahir also counted on the support of Nasif's roughly 10,000 Metawali cavalrymen. However, the Metawalis did not aid Zahir during the Ottoman offensive of 1775. Zahir's fortified villages and towns were equipped with artillery installments and his army's arsenal consisted of cannons, matchlock rifles, pistols and lances. Most of the firearms were imported from Venice or France, and by the early 1770s, the Russian imperial navy.

General security

According to Joudah, the two principal conditions Zahir established to foster his sheikhdom's prosperity and its survival were "security and justice". Before Zahir's consolidation of power, the villages of northern Palestine were prone to Bedouin raids and robberies and the roads were under constant threat from highway robbers and Bedouin attacks. This situation hurt the economy of the region as the raids sharply reduced the villages' agricultural output, tax collectors could not collect their impositions, and trade could not be safely conducted due to the insecurity of the roads.

By 1746, Zahir had established order in the lands he controlled. He coopted the dominant Bedouin tribe of the region, the Banu Saqr, which greatly contributed to the establishment of security in northern Palestine. Moreover, Zahir charged the sheikhs of the towns and villages of northern Palestine with ensuring the safety of the roads in their respective vicinity and required them to compensate anyone who was robbed of their property. General security reached a level whereby "an old woman with gold in her hand could travel from one place to another without fear or danger", according to Zahir's biographer Sabbagh.

The period of calm that persisted between 1744 and 1765 greatly boosted the security and economy of the Galilee. The security established in the region encouraged people from other parts of the empire to immigrate there. Conflict between the local clans and between Zahir and his sons remained limited to periodic clashes, while there were no external attacks against Zahir's domains. While Zahir used force to strengthen his position, the local inhabitants generally took comfort in his rule, which historian Thomas Philip described as "relatively just and reasonably fair". According to the traveler Richard Pococke, who visited the area in 1737, the local people had great admiration for Zahir, especially for his war against bandits on the roads.

Economic policies
In addition to providing security, Zahir and his local deputies adopted a policy of aiding peasants cultivate and harvest their farmlands as a means to ensure the steady supply of agricultural products for export. These benefits included loans to peasants and the distribution of free seeds. Financial burdens on the peasants were also reduced as Zahir offered tax relief during dry seasons or when harvests were poor. This same tax relief was extended to newcomers who sought to begin cultivating new farmlands. Moreover, Zahir assumed responsibility for outstanding payments the peasants owed to merchants from credit-based transactions, if the merchants could provide proof of unsatisfactory payment. According to Philipp, Zahir "had the good business sense not to exploit peasants to the point of destruction, but kept his financial demands to a more moderate level". He regularly paid the Ottoman authorities their financial dues, ensuring a degree of stability in his relationship with the sultanate.

After Zahir conquered Acre, he transformed it from a decaying village into a fortified market hub for Palestinian products, including silk, wheat, olive oil, tobacco and cotton, which he exported to Europe. Zahir monopolized the cotton market, controlling its production and foreign export. He did business with European merchants based in northern Palestine's ports, who competed with one another for the cotton and grain cultivated in the rural villages under Zahir's control or influence in the Galilee's hinterland and Jabal Amil. Before this, European merchants dealt directly with local cotton growers, but Zahir, with the help of Sabbagh, ended this system by assuming the role of middleman between the foreign merchants and the growers living under his rule. This allowed him to both monopolize cotton production and the merchants' price for the product. Zahir's pricing for the local cash crops prevented "exploitation" of the peasants and local merchants by European merchants and their "manipulation of the prices", according to Joudah. This caused financial losses to the Europeans, who lodged numerous complaints to the French and English ambassadors to the Ottoman government. A formal agreement to regulate commerce between Zahir and the European merchants was reached in 1753. Zahir further encouraged trade by offering local merchants interest-free loans.

The high European demand for cotton enabled Zahir to become wealthy and finance his autonomous sheikhdom. Control of the cotton market also allowed him to gain practical control of the Sidon Eyalet, except for the city of Sidon. With mixed success, Zahir attempted to have French merchant ships redirected from the ports of Tyre and Sidon to Haifa, in order to benefit from the customs fees he could exact. Acre underwent an economic boom as a result of its position in the cotton trade with France.

Relationship with religious minorities

Zahir governed with religious tolerance and encouraged the involvement of religious minorities in the local economy. As part of his wider efforts to increase the Galilee's population, Zahir invited Jews to settle in Tiberias around 1742, along with Muslims. He did not consider Jews to be a threat to his rule and believed that their connections with the Jewish diaspora would encourage economic development in Tiberias, which the Jews considered particularly holy. His tolerance towards the Jews, the cuts in taxes levied on them, and assistance in the construction of Jewish homes, schools and synagogues, helped foster the growth of the Jewish community. The initial Jewish immigrants came from Damascus and were later followed by Jews from Aleppo, Cyprus and Smyrna. Many Jews in Safed, which was governed by Zahir's son Ali, moved to Tiberias in the 1740s to take advantage of better opportunities in that city, which at the time was under Zahir's direct rule. Jewish communities were also established in the villages of Kafr Yasif and Shefa-Amr under Zahir's watch.

Zahir encouraged the settlement of Christians in Acre, in order to contribute to the city's commercial dynamism in trade and manufacturing. Christians grew to become the largest religious group in the city by the late 18th century. Zahir's territory became a haven for Melkites and Greek Orthodox from other parts of Ottoman Syria, who migrated there for better trade and employment opportunities. In Nazareth, the Christian community prospered and grew, receiving an influx of Maronites and Greek Orthodox from Mount Lebanon and Transjordan, respectively. The Melkite patriarch was based in Acre between 1765 and 1768. Along with Jews, Christians contributed to the economy of Zahir's sheikhdom through their relative ease in dealing with Christian European merchants, the financial support networks many of them maintained in Damascus or Constantinople, and their role in service industries.

Zahir allowed the Franciscan community of Nazareth to build churches in 1730, 1741 and 1754 on sites Christians associated with the life of Jesus. He allowed the Greek Orthodox community to build St. Gabriel's Church over a ruined Crusader church in Nazareth, and in 1750 they enlarged St. George's Church. The largest Christian community in Acre, the Melkites, built the city's largest church, St. Andrew's Church, in 1764, while the Maronites built St. Mary's Church for their congregation in 1750. As a testament to the exceptional prosperity Christians enjoyed under Zahir, no further churches were built under the auspices of the less tolerant successive rulers of Acre and the Galilee.

A strong relationship was maintained between Zahir and the Shia Muslim peasants of Jabal Amil and their sheikhs and merchant class. Zahir maintained law and order in Jabal Amil, while leaving its mostly Shia inhabitants to their own devices. The Shia also benefited economically from Zahir's monopoly of the cotton industry and their sheikhs provided him men of great military skills. Zahir was a key backer of the Shia in their successful conflict with the Druze Jumblatt clan and the Shihabs under Mulhim.

The relationship between Zahir and the rural sheikhs of the Druze of Mount Lebanon under the Shihabs were mixed. While Mansur Shihab of the Chouf allied with Zahir, his nephew and rival, Yusuf Shihab of the Tripoli region remained supportive of the Ottomans. Owing largely to the conflict between Zahir and the Druze emirs of Mount Lebanon, the Druze of the Galilee did not fare well under Zahir and his Zaydani clan. In the oral traditions of the Galilee's Druze, Zahir's reign was synonymous with oppression. During this period, many Druze villages were destroyed or abandoned, and there was a partial Druze exodus from the Galilee, especially from the villages around Safed, to the Hauran.

Family

Zahir had five wives during his lifetime. His marriages were politically advantageous, helping to seal his rule over areas he captured and consolidate relationships with Bedouin tribes, local clans, or urban notables. His first wife was the daughter of the Damascene religious notable, Sayyid Muhammad al-Husayni.

Zahir had eight sons from his wives, and according to Tobias Smollett, a daughter as well. His sons, from eldest to youngest, were Salibi, Ali, Uthman, Sa'id, Ahmad, Salih, Sa'd al-Din and Abbas. His daughter Nijma was married to Karim al-Ayyubi, who was a cousin of Zahir. By 1773, Zahir had a total of 272 children, grandchildren and great-grandchildren.

As Zahir consolidated his power and reduced external threats to his rule in the 1760s, his sons aspired for more influence and ultimately fought against their father and each other in order to secure their place as Zahir's successor. Besides support from elements of the Zaydani clan, Zahir's sons maintained their own power bases, largely derived from their mothers' clans, and also made their own alliances with other powerful actors in the region. Zahir was victorious in the many conflicts he had with his sons, but their frequent dissent weakened his rule and contributed to his downfall. Before his sons' rebellions, Zahir had eliminated other relatives who challenged his power.

Legacy

Zahir's rule radically changed the urban landscape of the Galilee. With the restoration and refortification of Acre and the establishment of the secondary port city of Haifa, the Galilee's ties with the Mediterranean world were significantly strengthened. Following his death, his successor Jazzar Pasha maintained the cotton monopoly Zahir had established and the Galilee's economy remained almost completely dependent on the cotton trade. The region prospered for decades, but with the rise of cotton production in the southern United States during the early–mid-19th century, European demand shifted away from Palestine's cotton. Because of its dependency on the crop, the region experienced a sharp economic downturn from which it could not recover. The cotton crop was largely abandoned, as were many villages, and the peasantry shifted its focus to subsistence agriculture.

In the late 19th century, the Palestine Exploration Fund's Claude Reignier Conder wrote that the Ottomans had successfully destroyed the power of Palestine's indigenous ruling families who "had practically been their own masters" but had been "ruined so that there is no longer any spirit left in them". Among these families were the "proud race" of Zahir, which was still held in high esteem, but was powerless and poor. Zahir's modern-day descendants in the Galilee use the surname 'Dhawahri' or 'al-Zawahirah' in Zahir's honor. The Dhawahri constitute one of the traditional elite Muslim clans of Nazareth, alongside the Fahum, Zu'bi and Onallas families. Other places in the Galilee where descendants of Zahir's clan live are Bi'ina and Kafr Manda and, before its 1948 destruction, Damun. Many of the inhabitants of modern-day northern Israel, particularly the towns and villages where Zahir or his family left an architectural legacy, hold Zahir in high regard.

Although he was mostly overlooked by historians of the Middle East, some scholars view Zahir's rule as a forerunner to Palestinian nationalism. Among them is Karl Sabbagh, who asserts the latter view in his book Palestine: A Personal History, which was widely reviewed in the British press in 2010. Zahir was gradually integrated into Palestinian historiography. In Murad Mustafa Dabbagh's Biladuna Filastin (1965), a multi-volume work about Palestine's history, Zahir is referred to as the "greatest Palestinian appearing in the eighteenth century". The Palestine Liberation Organization (PLO) radio station, Voice of Palestine, broadcast a series about Zahir in 1966, praising him as a Palestinian national hero who fought against Ottoman imperialism. Zahir is considered by many Arab nationalists as a pioneer of Arab liberation from foreign occupation. According to Joudah, However historians may look at Shaykh Zahir al-'Umar and his movement, he is highly respected by the Arabs of the East. In particular the Palestinians consider him a national hero who struggled against Ottoman authority for the welfare of his people. This praise is reflected in the recent academic, cultural and literary renaissance within Palestinian society that has elevated Zahir and his legacy to near-iconic status. These re-readings are not always bound to historical objectivity but are largely inspired by the ongoing consequences of the Nakba. Still it is precise to say that Shaykh Zahir had successfully established an autonomous state, or a "little Kingdom," as Albert Hourani called it, in most of Palestine for over a quarter of a century.Palestinian academic Nur Masalha described Zahir as "the founding father of early Palestinian modernities and social renewal". Masalha further argued that Palestine under the rule of Zahir was "the closest Palestine got to a modern independent state".

Building works
Zahir and his family built fortresses, watchtowers, warehouses, and khans (caravanserais). These buildings improved the domestic administration and general security of the Galilee. Today, many are in a state of disrepair and remain outside the scope of Israel's cultural preservation laws.

Acre

Zahir rebuilt the Crusader walls around Acre. Although considerable in their extent, Zahir's walls were designed to ward off pirates and Bedouin raiders, and could not defend well against the Ottoman military. Under Jazzar Pasha, major reconstruction of the walls was undertaken and the new walls largely remain in place in the present day. Part of Zahir's contributions are extant, mainly a section of the northeastern wall, and are characterized by small stone blocks. An inscription dated to 1750 on a marble slab that was removed from this part of the wall credits Zahir as the builder:

By the order of Allah this wall was erected in Akka [Acre] by a nobleman who generously acted.  The father of the heroes he is, the beloved Zahir.  May Allah reinforce his government forever.

He also built on top of a number of Crusader and Mamluk structures in the city. Among these were the caravanserais of Khan al-Shawarda and its Burj al-Sultan tower and Khan al-Shunah. The Crusader plan and main structure of Khan al-Shunah was preserved by Zahir in his restoration of the building in 1764, and it remained in use as an inn and market for traders until Haifa overtook Acre as the commercial center of the region in the late 19th century. It thereafter became housing for the poor. The original structure of the Suq al-Abyad (the White Bazaar), located in the northeastern corner of the walled city, was built by Zahir, though most of the present structure dates to an 1815 reconstruction by Acre's governor, Sulayman Pasha.

In 1748, Zahir commissioned the construction of the Muallaq Mosque. The building had been used as a synagogue; after Zahir converted it for Muslim use, he compensated the Jewish worshippers with property elsewhere in the city. The Zaytuna Mosque was built in Acre during his rule at the initiative of Hajj Muhammad al-Sadiq, or the local scholar Muhammad Shadi al-Farid, who financed its construction.

Nazareth

Zahir built the Seraya government house in Nazareth, which served as the city's municipal headquarters until 1991.

Haifa
Between 1765 and 1769, Zahir had Haifa demolished and rebuilt and fortified at a site  to the southeast. While the old village was situated on a plain, the new town, which remained a port along the Haifa Bay, was built on a narrow strip of land at the northern foot of Mount Carmel to make it easier to defend by land. In the new Haifa, Zahir built a wall around the town with four towers and two gates, none of which are extant. They existed at least until the early 19th century when David Roberts described and sketched the wall. Within Haifa, Zahir built Burj al-Salam, a two-story square tower, which remained intact until the 1970s. The original great mosque in new Haifa was probably built by Zahir, but most of the present building is a later construction. The remains of the  consist of a few cross-vaults lying on square pillars in a car park, while the eastern section of the structure is used for warehousing.

Tiberias

Zahir built fortifications around Tiberias in 1739–1740. Part of the walls originally ran along the shore of the Sea of Galilee and had eighteen towers. The fortifications were severely damaged in the 1837 earthquake. Most of the walls have been destroyed or form part of modern structures, while eight of the towers are extant.

The two-story square citadel with its four-round towers, located at the northeastern section of the fortifications, remains extant. Both stories of the citadel are characterized by three rows of cross vaults. The citadel was built by Zahir's son Salibi. As of 2001, the upper floor was operated as a restaurant, while the lower floor contained an art gallery. The citadel is locally often misidentified as the "Crusader castle/fortress".

In the present center of Tiberias, Zahir built a mosque, known after him as the Omari Mosque or the Zahiri Mosque. It consists of a prayer hall, a portico and a minaret. It was built with alternating white and black stone, typical of the architectural style of Zahir's building works. While there have been restorations since it was first constructed in the 1740s, the mosque retains its original plan.

Villages

Fortifications and other structures were built in the rural villages under Zahir's control. The Zaydans built a double wall around Deir Hanna, making it "the best example of a fortified village in the Galilee", according to Andrew Petersen. Zahir's brother Sa'd built the inner walls and the twelve towers which hovered over them, while Zahir built the outer walls. His son Ali added towers, detached from the walls, in front of the eastern and western sides. They also built a palace complex, including a mosque. The Zaydans' building works in Deir Hanna were severely damaged during Jazzar Pasha's siege. Nonetheless, considerable parts of the structures remain intact and as late as 1960, the town retained the same form of the fortress, with no structures built outside of the lines of the original fortifications.

North of Deir Kifa (in Lebanon) Zahir built the castle of Kulat Marun. In Khirbat Jiddin, Zahir rebuilt the demolished Crusader fortress with the addition of a mosque and hammam (bathhouse). The mosque was destroyed by Israeli forces when the village was captured during the 1948 Arab-Israeli War. In Shefa-Amr, Zahir's son Uthman built a large fortress with four towers, of which one remains standing. His son Ahmad rebuilt the Crusader fortress in Saffuriya. In the village of I'billin, Zahir's brother Yusuf built fortifications and a mosque. The I'billin fortress was later used as the headquarters of Aqil Agha, the 19th-century, semi-autonomous Arab sheikh of the Galilee.

In Tibnin, in modern Lebanon, and in Safed, Zahir or his son Ali rebuilt Crusader fortifications. Zahir fortified the village of Harbaj, though the village and its fort were in ruins by the late 19th century. At Tabgha on the Sea of Galilee, Zahir built five fountains, one of which remained standing by the 19th century. That remaining fountain was the largest of its kind in the Galilee.

See also
 Fakhr al-Din II, tax farmer and local strongman of Mount Lebanon, the Galilee, and the adjacent coasts in the late 16th–early 17th centuries.
 District of Acre
 Gigi and Bella Hadid: American models, claims descent from Zahir al-Umar through their father, Mohamed Hadid

References

Notes

Citations

Sources

 
 
 
 
 
 
 
 
 
 
 
 
 

 
 
 
 

 </ref>

Further reading
:it:Giovanni Mariti, 1774,  Istoria della guerra della Soria parte 1. proseguita fino alla morte di AlyBey dell'Egitto, parte 1
:it:Giovanni Mariti, 1774,  Istoria della guerra della Soria parte 2. proseguita fino alla morte di AlyBey dell'Egitto, parte  2

1690 births
1775 deaths
17th-century people from the Ottoman Empire
18th-century people from the Ottoman Empire
Arabs in Ottoman Palestine
Ottoman governors of Gaza
Ottoman governors of Sidon
Rebels from the Ottoman Empire
People from Arraba, Israel
People killed in action
Zaydani family
Ottoman rulers of Galilee
17th-century Arabs
18th-century Arabs